The Glass of Water: or, Effects and Causes (French: Le verre d’eau ou Les effets et les causes) is an 1840 five-act stage comedy by the French writer Eugène Scribe that is set at the court of Queen Anne of Great Britain during the early 18th century. It premiered at the Théâtre-Français in Paris on 17 November 1840 and has been translated into several languages, including into German in 1841 by Alexander Cosmar.

The play is a prime example of the well-made play or 'Pièce bien faite', in which all the characters' motivations are so interlocked that the action at any given point is markedly consistent in an almost positivist way, with the political and historical processes making up its theme acting perfectly logically and consistently. Its subtitle Effects and Causes clearly refers to this understanding of history and theories of progression, typical of the mid 19th century.

Plot
Anne is not a strong ruler and remains under the influence of Sarah, Duchess of Marlborough. The queen is attempting to end the War of the Spanish Succession but Sarah hopes to profit from prolonging it and thus keeping her husband the Duke of Marlborough in his position as commander-in-chief of the British army.

Sarah's greatest enemy is Lord Bolingbroke (a fictionalised version of Henry St John, 1st Viscount Bolingbroke), who wants peace, the Marlboroughs' fall from grace and the position of prime minister. To achieve this, he makes use of Masham, a young officer in the royal guard who is in love with both Sarah and Anne. Bolingbroke thus turns the two women's feelings to the advantage of his own court intrigues.

Marlborough opposes Bolingbroke, leading the British government inscrutably and arbitrarily. It is Marlborough who is mainly responsible for what Bolingbroke sees as the unnecessary and costly war against Louis XIV of France and Bolingbroke accuses him of acting according to the maxim "The most insignificant things can often have the greatest impact. You may think, as does all the world, that political disasters, revolutions, the fall of an Empire, originate from serious, deep, important causes. Not even close! States are subjugated or defended by heroes, by great men, but those great men are led by little passions, caprices, vanities. "(Act I, Scene 4).

Adaptations
The play has been adapted for television in Sweden in 1960 as Ett Glas vatten (with Gunnel Lindblom as Anne), in Hungary in 1977 as Sakk-matt (with Judit Halász as Anne) and twice in the USSR of the same title Stakan vody (Стакан воды) (once as a 1957 television play and once as a 1979 telefilm with Natalya Belokhvostikova as Anne). It has also been adapted for film twice times in Germany (once as a 1923 silent film and once as a musical in 1960).

References

1840 plays
Cultural depictions of Anne, Queen of Great Britain
Cultural depictions of Sarah Churchill, Duchess of Marlborough
Plays about British royalty
Plays based on real people
Plays set in England
Plays set in the 18th century
Plays adapted into television shows
French plays adapted into films
Plays by Eugène Scribe